Rosario Montt Goyenechea (1820s – 1894) was the First Lady of Chile from 1851 to 1861, during the presidency of her husband, Manuel Montt.

Early life 
María del Rosario Montt Goyenechea was born in Chile, the daughter of Filiberto Montt Prado (1758–1838) and María de la Luz Goyenechea de la Sierra, and part of the prominent Montt family, originally from Catalonia. Her older brother was politician José Anacleto Montt Goyenechea (1802-1867).

Marriage and legacy 
Montt was in her teens when she married her older cousin, government official Manuel Montt Torres (1809–1880) in 1839, in Casablanca, Chile. They had sixteen children together. She was the First Lady of Chile from 1851 to 1861, during the presidency of her husband. Because he was the target of attempted assassinations, she was the only person allowed to shave her husband's face or cut his hair. She was widowed when Manuel Montt died in 1880, and she died in 1894, about seventy years old, in San Bernardo. 

Montt's home in Santiago was declared a national historic site in 1981. From 1891 to 1896, her nephew Jorge Montt was president of Chile. From 1906 to 1910, her son Pedro Montt was president of Chile. Poet Teresa Wilms Montt was her great-granddaughter.

References 

1820s births
1894 deaths
Year of birth uncertain
First ladies of Chile
Montt family